Coquette (Spanish:Coqueta) is a 1949 Mexican musical film directed by Fernando A. Rivero, and starring Ninón Sevilla, Agustín Lara, and Víctor Junco.

The film's art direction was by José Rodríguez Granada.

Cast
 Ninón Sevilla as Marta del Valle
 Agustín Lara as Don Rubén
 Víctor Junco as Luciano Martínez, el caimán 
 Armando Silvestre as Rodolfo
 José Luis Moreno as Margarito
 César del Campo as Mario Roel
 Tana Lynn as Belén
 Waldo Custodio as Sr. Rivera, dueño cabaret 
 Irma Haro Esmeralda as Cantante
 Haydeé Caceres 
 Kiko Mendive as Bailarín
 Mercedes Soler as Maestra
 Jorge Mondragón as Doctor
 Gaby Roman 
 Enriqueta Reza as Tendera solterona 
 Lupe Carriles as Tendera solterona
 Gerardo del Castillo as Amigo del Luciano
 Ana María Hernández as Miembra del patronato 
 Concepción Martínez as Huesped hotel
 Kika Meyer as Cabaretera borracha
 José Morcillo as Presidente del patronato
 Rubén Márquez as Cliente cabaret
 Lupita Torrentera as Bailarina

References

Bibliography 
 Andrew Grant Wood. Agustin Lara: A Cultural Biography. OUP USA, 2014.

External links 
 

1949 films
1949 musical films
Mexican musical films
1940s Spanish-language films
Films directed by Fernando A. Rivero
Mexican black-and-white films
1940s Mexican films